Irfan Ahsan Kaleem Bhatti (born September 28, 1964 in Peshawar) is a former Pakistani cricketer who played one ODI in 1992.

References 

1964 births
Living people
Pakistan One Day International cricketers
Pakistani cricketers
Rawalpindi cricketers
Islamabad cricketers
Rawalpindi B cricketers
Khan Research Laboratories cricketers